Chattis Hill is a hamlet in the Test Valley district of Hampshire, England. The village lies approximately 2 miles (3.3 km) west from Stockbridge, which both lie on the A30 road. At the 2011 Census the Post Office indicates that the population of the hamlet was included in the civil parish  of Broughton.

Hamlets in Hampshire
Test Valley